The Barton line is a railway line in North and North East Lincolnshire, England. It runs from Barton-upon-Humber south east to Cleethorpes and was designated by the Department for Transport as a community rail line in February 2007. Barton station is near to the Humber Bridge. It is situated on the south bank of the Humber Estuary.

Stations served
The stations served by the route are listed below.
Barton-on-Humber
Barrow Haven
New Holland
Goxhill
Thornton Abbey 
Ulceby
Habrough
Stallingborough
Healing
Great Coates 
Grimsby Town
Grimsby Docks 
New Clee
Cleethorpes

Services and rolling stock 
Passenger services on the line are provided by East Midlands Railway  but used to be operated by Northern Trains services on the line were due to switch to East Midlands Railway from the start of the new franchise in August 2019, but this transfer was deferred until May 2021. Services are operated by one Class 156 unit every two hours in each direction on weekdays. Sunday trains only run during the summer months (May to early September).

Before Class 156s operated the line, Class 153s, Class 142s and Class 150s (and before that Class 114) DMU sets were used. This practice ceased at the December 2013 timetable change and the first train from Cleethorpes now serves all intermediate stations other than New Clee, which is currently served by trains on request during daylight hours only. East Midlands Railway currently operate the line with Class 156s.

Since the closure of the chemical plant no scheduled freight services operate on the route, though occasional trainloads have operated from the bulk grain terminal at New Holland (which now occupies the former pier it remained rail-connected for a period, but the tracks are now in disrepair and unusable).

Infrastructure
West of Ulceby the line is double as far as Oxmarsh Crossing (near New Holland), reverting to single for the final  to the terminus at Barton. This section has several manual signal boxes with semaphore signalling and manned & gated level crossings in operation. Network Rail planned to re-signal the line in 2015–16, with control passing to the York Rail Operating Centre – the level crossings on the line were automated and the existing signal box at Ulceby Junction abolished (those at Goxhill, Barrow Road and Oxmarsh Crossing remain).

History
The  to  section of the line follows the Great Grimsby and Sheffield Junction Railway, opened in 1848. This subsequently became part of the Manchester, Sheffield and Lincolnshire Railway and eventually the London and North Eastern Railway at the 1923 Grouping.  The line was extended to Cleethorpes by the MS&LR in 1863, with a branch from Goxhill to the docks at Immingham added in 1911.  The line was particularly busy during the Second World War, as it served Royal Air Force airfields at Goxhill and Killingholme in addition to the various industrial installations in the area.  The line was twice proposed for closure in the 1960s (in 1963 and again four years later), but was reprieved on each occasion (though the Goxhill to Immingham Line did close in June 1963).

Prior to the opening of the Humber Bridge in June 1981, passenger services ran via  where they connected with the Humber Ferry service across the Humber to Corporation Pier in Hull but after the bridge was commissioned the ferry service was withdrawn and a new chord line and replacement station provided at New Holland to allow trains to run directly to and from Barton. Since then, the connection to and from Hull has been provided by Stagecoach in Lincolnshire bus over the bridge and now operates out of Hull Paragon Interchange.

The service ran hourly until the spring of 1990, but was cut to the current two-hourly pattern at that year's timetable change by British Rail due to unreliability and a shortage of rolling stock.  The winter Sunday service also suffered the same fate in 1999 following the abolition of Humberside County Council and subsequent withdrawal of funding by the replacement unitary authorities.

Signalling 
The south end of the line is signalled under Track Circuit Block by the York Rail Operating Centre. To the north, several signal boxes control the line under Absolute Block with semaphores. The single section is signalled under One Train Working with staff, with the signaller at Oxmarsh Crossing signal box giving the staff and collecting it.

References

External links

Barton Cleethorpes Community Rail Partnership website www.bccrp.co.uk
Friends of The Barton Line Rail user group for the route
Photo Gallery of the Route in 2001

Rail transport in Lincolnshire
Community railway lines in England
Railway lines in Yorkshire and the Humber
Standard gauge railways in England